Saint-Elphège is a parish municipality located on the east bank of the Saint-François River in the Nicolet-Yamaska Regional County Municipality of Quebec, Canada. The population as of the Canada 2011 Census was 292.

Demographics 

Population trend:

Mother tongue language (2006)

See also
List of parish municipalities in Quebec

References

External links

Parish municipalities in Quebec
Incorporated places in Centre-du-Québec
Nicolet-Yamaska Regional County Municipality